Live at Folsom Field, Boulder, Colorado is the fourth live album released by the Dave Matthews Band.  It was recorded in Boulder, Colorado at Folsom Field, the football stadium of the University of Colorado Boulder on July 11, 2001. It was released on the RCA Records music label on November 5, 2002 on Compact Disc, VHS, and DVD. The DVD was directed by Fenton Williams of Filament Productions. In promotional material prior to the release, the album was originally titled Open up the Curtains, a reference to the song "I Did It."

Track listing
Disc one
"Don't Drink the Water" – 9:10
"JTR" – 6:52
with The Lovely Ladies
"When the World Ends" – 3:46
"So Right" – 6:15
"Big Eyed Fish" –  7:08
"Bartender" – 9:54
"What You Are" – 6:56
"Crash into Me" – 5:57
"Everyday" – 8:42
with The Lovely Ladies
"I Did It" – 3:44
with The Lovely Ladies
"If I Had It All" – 4:31
with The Lovely Ladies

Disc two
<li value="12">"Angel" – 14:29
with The Lovely Ladies
"Warehouse" – 9:25
"Recently" – 4:12
"Digging A Ditch" – 5:33
"What Would You Say" – 4:53
"All Along the Watchtower" (Dylan) – 9:24
with Butch Taylor
"The Space Between" – 5:00
with The Lovely Ladies
"Stay (Wasting Time)" – 7:47
"Two Step" – 9:18
"Ants Marching" – 7:55</ol>

Personnel
Dave Matthews Band
Carter Beauford – percussion, drums
Stefan Lessard – bass guitar
Dave Matthews – acoustic and electric guitar, vocals
LeRoi Moore – saxophone
Boyd Tinsley – electric violin

Guests
The Lovely Ladies – vocals
Tawatha Agee
Cindy Myzell
Brenda White King
Butch Taylor – keyboards

Technical personnel
Doug Biro ....  executive producer: RCA Records
Danny O'Bryen ....  producer
Hugh Surratt ....  executive producer: RCA Records
Fenton Williams ....  producer
Stephan Gomes ....  set carpenter: DMB tour crew
John Alagia ....  stereo mixer
Jeff Child ....  audio technician: DMB tour crew
Derek Featherstone ....  audio technician: DMB tour crew
Scott Harvey ....  delay audio: tour
Jeff Juliano ....  stereo mixer
Gary Long ....  sound
Lonnie Quinn ....  audio crew chief: DMB tour crew
Larry Reed ....  sound
Derek Sample ....  sound re-recording mixer: Post Fix Inc.
Stewart Whitmore ....  digital sound editor: Marcussen Mastering, Hollywood, CA (as Stewart Whitemore)
Jeff Richter ....  supervising editor
Ed Cherney ....  music mixer: Capitol Studios, Los Angeles, CA
Steve Genewick ....  assistant music mixer: Capitol Studios, Los Angeles, CA
Stephen Marcussen ....  music mastering
Doug Biro ....  creative director: RCA Records
Hugh Surratt ....  creative director: RCA Records
Chris Osterhus – film editing
Jeff Richter – film editing
Greg Rogers – film editing

Year-end charts

References 

Albums produced by John Alagía
Dave Matthews Band live albums
Dave Matthews Band video albums
2002 live albums
2002 video albums
Live video albums
RCA Records live albums
RCA Records video albums